Gezer is a Turkish surname. Notable people with the surname include:

Hüseyin Gezer (1920–2013), Turkish sculptor
Muhsine Gezer (born 2003), Turkish female para-athlete
Sultan Günal-Gezer (born 1961), Dutch female politician of Turkish descent

Turkish-language surnames